The Illustrious Royal Order of Saint Januarius (Italian: Insigne Reale Ordine di San Gennaro) is a Roman Catholic order of knighthood founded by Charles VII of Naples in 1738. It was the last great dynastic order to be constituted as a chivalric fraternity, with a limitation to Roman Catholics and a direct attachment to the dynasty rather than the state. The founder of the order, Charles VII of Naples, ruled from 1734 until 1759.

The grand magistry of the order is disputed among claimants to the headship of the formerly reigning House of Bourbon-Two Sicilies.

Structure of the order
Originally, the order had four principal officers, whose duties were to administer its affairs:
 Chancellor
 Secretary 
 Treasurer 
 Master of Ceremonies

A reform of 17 August 1827, limited these duties to certain ceremonial roles at the installation of knights, and no successors were appointed to the then-holders of these offices.

The order today

The order continues to be awarded today by the two claimants to the headship of the royal House of Bourbon-Two Sicilies, Prince Pedro, Duke of Calabria and Prince Carlo, Duke of Castro.

Since 1960, the order has been awarded sparingly and total membership has not exceeded eighty, most of the knights being members of royal houses, senior officers of the Sacred Military Constantinian Order of Saint George, or Italian grandees.

Members
, the knights appointed by Prince Pedro, Duke of Calabria, his father and grandfather, were:

 HM King Juan Carlos I of Spain, 19-2-1960.
 HM King Simeon II of the Bulgarians, 30-3-1960.
 HRH Dom Duarte Pio, Duke of Braganza, 2-10-1990.
 HRH Alexander Karageorgevich of Serbia, 8-1-1991.
 HIRH Archduke Simeon of Austria, 4-11-2002.
 Don Vincenzo-Capasso Torre, XVI Count delle Pastène and V Conte of Caprara, 14-6-1960.
 Don Iñigo de Moreno e Arteaga, 1 Marquess of Laserna, 6-1-1961
 Hervé Pinoteau, Baron Pinoteau, 13-4-1963.
 Don José-Maria de Palacio y Oriol, IV Marquess of Villarreal de Alava, 19-9-1972
 Guy Stair Sainty, 19-9-1979
 HE Don Carlos Fitz-James Stuart, 19th Duke of Alba de Tormes, Berwick, Liria and Xerica, Grandee of Spain, 2-10-1990.
 Count Don Agostino Borromeo, 25-9-2002.
 Don Roberto Dentice di Accadia, Marquess of Accadia, 25-9-2002.
 Prince Don Alberto Giovanelli, 25-9-2002.
 HSH Prince and Marquess Don Maurizio Ferrante Gonzaga di Vescovato, 5-9-2002.
 Noble Don Alesandro of the Counts Mariotti Solimani, 25-9-2002.
   Nobile Don Lorenzo de' Notaristefani, 25-9-2002.
   Ambassador Don Giuseppe Bonanno, Prince of Linguaglossa, (... 2003). 
 HEm Cardinal Dario Castrillón Hoyos, April 2016.

, the knights appointed by Prince Carlo, Duke of Castro, his father and grandfather, were:

 Prince Carlo, Duke of Castro and Grand Master
 Antonio Maria of Bourbon Two Sicilies
 Francesco Maria of Bourbon Two Sicilies
 Gennaro Maria of Bourbon Two Sicilies
 Luigi Alfonso Maria of Bourbon Two Sicilies
 Alessandro Enrico Maria of Bourbon Two Sicilies
 Casimiro Maria of Bourbon Two Sicilies
 Matthew Festing, Prince and Grand Master of the Sovereign Military Order of Malta
 Duarte Pio, Duke of Braganza
 Jean, Count of Paris (19 March 2019, installed 13 May 2019)
 Renato Raffaele Cardinal Martino
 Count Andrzej Ciechanowiecki +2015
 Ambassador Count Carlo Marullo di Condojanni, Prince of Casalnuovo
 Duke and Count Don Ferdinando Gaetani dell’Aquila d’Aragona, Prince of Piedmont, Duke of Laurenzana, Count of Alife,
 Duke Francesco d’Avalos, Prince of the Holy Roman Empire, Marquess of Pescara and Vasto
 Prince Filippo Massimo, Prince of Arsoli and Duke of Anticoli Corrado
 Prince Carlo Cito Filomarino, Prince of Rocca d’Aspro, Prince of Bitetto, Marquess of Torrecuso
 Prince Gregorio Carafa Cantelmo Stuart, Prince of the Holy Roman Empire, Prince of Roccella, Duke of Bruzzano
 Don Roberto Caracciolo, Duke of San Vito
 Prince Giovanni Battista de’Medici, Prince of Ottajano, Duke of Casalnuovo

See also
 Order of Saint Ferdinand and of Merit
 Order of Saint George and Reunion
 Royal Order of Francis I
 Sacred Military Constantinian Order of Saint George

References

External links

 History of the Order of Saint Januarius
 Order of Saint Januarius webpage on the Constantinian Order website (including roll of members)

Awards established in 1738